Francis "Frank" Crawford Armstrong (November 22, 1835 – September 8, 1909) was a United States Army cavalry officer and later a brigadier general in the Confederate States Army during the American Civil War. He is also known for being the only Confederate general to fight on both sides during the Civil War.

Early life and career
Armstrong was born on the Choctaw Agency in the Indian Territory, where his army officer father had been stationed. Armstrong's father, Francis Wells Armstrong, died three months before his son's birth. In 1854, Armstrong's mother married Mexican–American War General Persifor Smith. In 1854, Armstrong accompanied his stepfather on an expedition of the United States Army troops into the New Mexico Territory. His gallantry in a battle against Indians near Eagle Spring gained him a commission as a lieutenant of the 2nd Dragoon Regiment in 1855, following his graduation from College of the Holy Cross in Worcester, Massachusetts. Armstrong then campaigned with Albert Sidney Johnston against the Mormons during the Utah War.

Civil War service
In June 1861, Armstrong was promoted to captain in the regular army. In July, he led a company of Union cavalry at the First Battle of Bull Run. However, Armstrong resigned his commission and on August 10, 1861, he joined the Confederate Army. As Armstrong's Union resignation did not go into effect until August 13, he was technically on both sides at the same time. He served as a staff officer under Confederate generals James M. McIntosh and Benjamin McCulloch before their deaths at the Battle of Pea Ridge, and was standing only feet away as McCulloch was killed.

In 1863 Armstrong was elected as colonel of the 3rd Louisiana Infantry Regiment, and was soon given command of the cavalry of Major General Sterling Price. Two months later, he was promoted to brigadier general and commanded a cavalry division under Nathan Bedford Forrest at the Battle of Chickamauga.

In February 1864, Armstrong requested a transfer to the command of Maj. Gen. Stephen D. Lee. He was assigned command of a brigade of Mississippi cavalry previously led by Colonel Peter B. Starke. Armstrong and his men accompanied Lt. Gen. Leonidas Polk's corps to Georgia and served in the Atlanta Campaign, before participating in Lt. Gen. John B. Hood's disastrous campaign. He saw action during the campaign against Murfreesboro, and led much of Forrest's rear guard after the Hood's defeat at the Battle of Nashville.

On March 23, Armstrong was assigned to the defenses of Selma, Alabama, one of the Confederacy's last remaining industrial centers. On April 2, 1865, his troops participated in efforts to defend the town against a much larger Union force under Maj. Gen. James H. Wilson. Armstrong was captured later that day.

Post-war years
With the return of peace Armstrong worked for the Overland Mail Service in Texas. Because of his frontier and military experience, he served as United States Indian Inspector from 1885 until 1889, and was the Assistant Commissioner of Indian Affairs from 1893 to 1895.

Armstrong died in Bar Harbor, Maine in 1909, and was buried in Rock Creek Cemetery in Washington, D.C. He married Maria Polk Walker, daughter of Col. Joseph Knox Walker. Col. Walker is the brother of Lucius Marshall Walker, who also served as a Confederate general.

See also

 List of American Civil War generals (Confederate)
 Joseph G. Sanders - A Confederate captain from Alabama who switched sides in 1864 and finished the war as a lieutenant in the Federal Army.
 Alfred Thomas Archimedes Torbert A Union Army Officer who declined a CS Officers Commission in 1861

Notes

References
 Black, Robert W., Cavalry Raids of the Civil War (2004)
 Evans, Clement, ed. Confederate Military History, Vol. VIII. Atlanta, Georgia: Confederate Publishing Company, 1899.
 Heidler, David S., and Heidler, Jeanne T., "Frank Crawford Armstrong", Encyclopedia of the American Civil War: A Political, Social, and Military History, Heidler, David S., and Heidler, Jeanne T., eds., W. W. Norton & Company, 2000, .
 Jones, Terry L., Historical dictionary of the Civil War (2002)
 Kelly, C. Brian, Smyer-Kelly, Ingrid, Best Little Ironies, Oddities, and Mysteries of the Civil War (2000)
 Linedecker, Clifford L., ed., Civil War, A-Z: The Complete Handbook of America's Bloodiest Conflict. New York: Ballantine Books, 2002. 
 Warner, Ezra J., Generals in Gray: Lives of the Confederate Commanders, Louisiana State University Press, 1959, .

1835 births
1909 deaths
Military personnel from Oklahoma
United States Army officers
Confederate States Army brigadier generals
People of Arkansas in the American Civil War
Burials at Rock Creek Cemetery